Motivation is a studio album released by Bertín Osborne in 1989. It was the first (and to date, only) all-English-language release from the popular Spanish singer.
The album was recorded in Miami, Florida, at Criteria Studios and Middle Ear Recording Studio.

Despite Osborne's popularity in Spain, the disc was not officially released in his home country, though it was available as an import.

Track listing
"Motivation" (Rudy Pérez, J. Farrell) - 3:55
"Like a Fool" (Bee Gees) - 4:06
"If I Could Only Change Her Mind" (Scott Cutler, Clyde Lieberman) - 3:40
"Toys" (Bee Gees) - 5:03
"Fallin'" (Michael Bolton, Bobby Caldwell) - 3:55
"Freedom" (Riccardo Cocciante, J. Johnston) - 3:41
"Closer to the Edge" (Bernie Taupin, Martin Page) - 4:49
"Prove Me Wrong" (Billy Simon, Wayne Kirkpatrick) - 4:25
"On the Heels of a Heartache" (B. Crew, J. Corbetta, M. Holden) - 4:19
"The End" (D. Kisselbach, L. Merlino) - 3:44

Personnel 
 Bertín Osborne – lead vocals
 Rudy Pérez – guitar, percussion, backing vocals, additional engineering
 Brian Monroney – guitar
 Rene Luis Toledo – guitar
 Julio Hernandez - bass guitar
 George "Chocolate" Perry – bass guitar
 Richard Eddie – programming and keyboards
 Tony Concepcion - horns
 Kenny Faulk - horns
 Dana Tebo - horns
 Ed Calle - horns
 Rita Quintero - backing vocals
 Wendy Pedersen - backing vocals
 Latisha Vining - backing vocals
 Mike Couzzi – engineering and mixing
 Mike Spring - additional engineering, assistant engineer
 Mike Fuller - mastering
 Paco Navarro - cover photo
 Antonio Gramatica - cover design

References

1989 albums